Matthew Clayton Long (born May 18, 1980) is an American actor. He is best known for playing Ezekiel Landon in the NBC/Netflix sci fi drama Manifest (2019–Present), and his roles in the television series Jack & Bobby (2004–2005), and the films Ghost Rider (2007) and Sydney White (2007).

Life and career
Long was born in Winchester, Kentucky, to an insurance salesman father and an assistant teacher mother. He has one younger sibling, Zach. He attended Western Kentucky University where he met his wife, Lauren. He was also a member of Sigma Alpha Epsilon fraternity. After graduation, Long moved to New York City, where he worked as an actor in various theaters. In 2004 he was cast as a lead on the critically acclaimed but short-lived The WB drama series Jack & Bobby, and later starred in several TV pilots and appeared in movies, including Ghost Rider and Sydney White.

Long played the lead role in the short-lived ABC drama series The Deep End in 2010. He also had the recurring role of Joey Baird in the AMC drama series Mad Men, and in 2012 was cast in the ABC pilot Gilded Lilys, created and produced by Shonda Rhimes. Rhimes later cast him in her medical drama Private Practice in a recurring role as Dr. James Peterson. In 2013, Long was cast as a lead in another ABC drama series, Lucky 7.

In 2019, Long appeared as recurring character Zeke Landon during the first season of the NBC drama Manifest, and was promoted to the main cast for season 2.

Filmography

Film

Television

References

External links

Matt Long on Instagram

1980 births
Living people
American male film actors
American male television actors
People from Winchester, Kentucky
Western Kentucky University alumni